Pantopsalis is a genus of eleven species of harvestman in the family Neopilionidae. They are all endemic to New Zealand. Males of some species are notable for their enlarged chelicerae.

The following species are considered valid:

 Pantopsalis albipalpis Pocock 1902
 Pantopsalis cheliferoides (Colenso 1882)
 Pantopsalis coronata Pocock 1903
 Pantopsalis halli Hogg 1920
 Pantopsalis johnsi Forster 1964
 Pantopsalis listeri (White 1849)
 Pantopsalis luna (Forster 1944)
 Pantopsalis phocator Taylor 2004
 Pantopsalis pococki Hogg 1920
 Pantopsalis rennelli Forster 1964

References

Arachnids of New Zealand
Harvestmen